Awalt may refer to:

Awalt, Tennessee, a ghost town in Franklin County
Rob Awalt, former professional American football player